Max Christie may refer to:

 Max Christie (politician) (1889–1982), New Zealand politician
 Max Christie (footballer) (born 1971), Scottish professional footballer
 Max Christie (basketball) (born 2003), American basketball player